Korchyn  is a village (selo) in Stryi Raion, Lviv Oblast, in Western Ukraine.  
The village is located along the Stryi River, on the road between the urban-type settlements of Verkhnie Synovydne and Skhidnytsia. Korchyn belongs to Skole urban hromada, one of the hromadas of Ukraine.
Local government — Korchynska village council.

History 

The first record of the village dates back to 1446. 
Historically Korchyn divided into two parts: Eastern part —  the ancient name Korchyn Rustykalnyy and Western part — Korchyn Shlyahetskyy.

Until 18 July 2020, Korchyn belonged to Skole Raion. The raion was abolished in July 2020 as part of the administrative reform of Ukraine, which reduced the number of raions of Lviv Oblast to seven. The area of Skole Raion was merged into Stryi Raion.

Attractions 
The village includes two architectural sights:
 St. Cosmas and Damian's Church (wood), 1824 (504/1-М). 
 The bell tower of the church of St. Cosmas and Demyan, 1824 (504/2-М).

Gallery

References

External links 
 Населенні пункти Сколівського району  -  Корчин
 weather.in.ua

Literature 
  Page 717.

Villages in Stryi Raion